Garret Dorset Wall (March 10, 1783November 22, 1850) was a military officer and Senator from New Jersey. He was elected as governor of New Jersey, but refused to assume office.

Early career
Born in Middletown Township, he completed preparatory studies, studied law, was licensed as an attorney in 1804 and as a counselor in 1807, and commenced practice in Burlington, New Jersey. He served in the War of 1812 and commanded a volunteer regiment from Trenton.

Politics 
He was clerk of the New Jersey Supreme Court from 1812 to 1817, and was Quartermaster General of New Jersey from 1815 to 1837. He was a member of the New Jersey General Assembly in 1827 and was U.S. Attorney for the District of New Jersey in 1829; Wall was elected Governor of New Jersey in 1829, but declined to serve; he was then elected as a Jacksonian (later, a Democrat) to the U.S. Senate and served from March 4, 1835, to March 3, 1841; he was an unsuccessful candidate for reelection. While in the Senate, he was chairman of the Committee on the Militia (Twenty-fourth and Twenty-fifth Congresses) and a member of the Committees on the Judiciary (Twenty-fifth and Twenty-sixth Congresses) and Military Affairs (Twenty-fifth Congress).

Wall was a judge of the New Jersey Court of Errors and Appeals of New Jersey from 1848 until his death in Burlington in 1850. He was buried in Saint Mary's Episcopal Churchyard in Burlington.

Relatives 
Garret D. Wall was the father of James Walter Wall, also a U.S. Senator from New Jersey. His daughter Maria Matilda Wall was the wife of Peter Dumont Vroom and mother of Peter D. Vroom.

Legacy 
Wall Township, New Jersey is named in his honor.

References

External links

Garret Dorset Wall at The Political Graveyard

1783 births
1850 deaths
People from Middletown Township, New Jersey
American Episcopalians
Jacksonian United States senators from New Jersey
Democratic Party United States senators from New Jersey
Democratic Party governors of New Jersey
Democratic Party members of the New Jersey General Assembly
New Jersey Jacksonians
Justices of the Supreme Court of New Jersey
United States Attorneys for the District of New Jersey
Quartermasters General of New Jersey
New Jersey lawyers
American militiamen in the War of 1812
American militia officers
Burials in New Jersey
19th-century American judges
19th-century American lawyers
19th-century American politicians